Public holidays in Australia refer to the holidays recognised in law in Australia. Although they are declared on a state and territory basis, they comprise a mixture of nationally celebrated days and holidays exclusive to the individual jurisdictions.

Public holidays function as non-working days, with workers generally receiving full paid leave independently of annual leave. Those working on public holidays receive additional penalty rates of pay. Where they fall on a weekend, public holidays are generally declared in lieu for the following Monday.

Statutory holidays in Australia are based on varying religious, cultural and civic observations. Christian celebrations, namely Christmas and Easter, are some of the most significant ones observed. A Labour Day is observed in each state and territory, although it is varied in date. There are two significant national days, Australia Day (26 January) and Anzac Day (25 April), which are nationwide public holidays.

When a public holiday occurs on a Friday or Monday, the three-day period is colloquially known as a "long weekend".

Nature of public holidays
Traditionally, Australians in employment (whether in the public or private sector) have had the right to take a public holiday off work with regular pay. In recent years this tradition has changed somewhat. For example, businesses that normally open on a public holiday may request employees to work on that day. Employers can deny employees a holiday only on reasonable business grounds.

From 2006, WorkChoices eliminated the entitlement to penalty rates in many workplaces; however since the implementation of the Fair Work Act 2009 and the modern awards in 2010, most public-holiday penalty rates have increased dramatically.  employees generally receive pay at a penalty rate—usually 2.5 times (known as "double time and a half") the base rate of pay—when they work on a public holiday.

Besides designating days as public holidays, Australian authorities also designate some of these days as restricted trading days.

Public holidays are determined by a combination of:
 statutes, with specific gazetting of public holidays 
 industrial awards and agreements

If a standard public holiday falls on a weekend, a substitute public holiday will sometimes be observed on the first non-weekend day (usually Monday) after the weekend, whether by virtue of the public holiday legislation or by ad hoc proclamation. Workers required to work on a public holiday or substituted public holiday will usually be entitled to remuneration at a holiday penalty rate.

All states have their own public holidays in addition to national public holidays, and in some states certain public holidays, such as Melbourne Cup Day, are in force in only part of a state.

Alcohol licences in several states prevent sale of alcohol on certain public holidays, such as Good Friday.

Public holidays

 Legend:
 B City of Brisbane only. The Royal National Agricultural (RNA) Show Day (Brisbane only) is held on the Wednesday during the RNA Show period. The RNA Show commences on the first Friday in August, unless the first Friday is prior to 5 August, then it commences on the second Friday of August. Other Queensland show holidays: Show holiday dates | Public, school and show holidays
 C = Conditional: Public Service employees or where defined in Employment Agreement/Award

 H = Hobart area only
 NH = Not Hobart area
 P Part day, from 7 pm to midnight (6 pm to midnight for QLD)
 † Often substituted with the Geelong Cup for Geelong residents. For regional Victoria other local cup days are sometimes substituted. 
 * The holiday is legislated for the 3rd Monday of May. Since 2006 it has been moved via the issuing of a special Proclamation by the Governor, to the 2nd Monday of March, on a trial basis.
 ** Sunday is nominally a public holiday in South Australia
 *** Depends on occupation, generally from 6 pm to midnight

Substitute holidays for holidays falling on a weekend
When a public holiday falls on a weekend, the following work day may be considered a public holiday depending on the state/territory and the holiday in question.

Holidays that always fall on a particular day of the week are not listed in this table. Prior to 2008, Victorian law only specified substitute holidays for New Year and Boxing Day, and only if they fell on a Sunday. From 2008, Victorian law specifies the substitute holidays in the table above.

Since Easter Monday can occur as late as 26 April it is possible for the Easter Monday holiday to coincide with Anzac Day, as occurred in 2011.  State Acts do not give a provision to separate the days when this occurs, so no additional public holiday is given by law. However an extra day is usually proclaimed by the minister, so as to have a steady number of public holidays each year. In the year 2038, Anzac Day will coincide with Easter Sunday.

Australia Day
Nationally, Australia Day was originally celebrated on 30 July 1915.

Recorded celebrations of the 26 January date back to 1808 in Australia, and in 1818, Governor Lachlan Macquarie held the first official celebration of Australia Day.  26 January was chosen because it is the day of the establishment of the first British settlement at Port Jackson by Captain Arthur Phillip in 1788.  It was made a public holiday in New South Wales in 1836, and Victoria adopted the day as a public holiday in 1931. The 26 January commenced to be recognised by all states and territories as Australia Day in 1946.

Australia Day has been celebrated as a national public holiday on 26 January since 1994.

Since 1960, the winner of the Australian of the Year award is announced by the Prime Minister on the eve of Australia Day (25 Jan).

Labour Day

Labour Day commemorates the achievements of the Australian labour movement. The celebration of Labour Day has its origins in the eight-hour day movement, which advocated eight hours for work, eight hours for recreation, and eight hours for rest. On 21 April 1856 Stonemasons and building workers on building sites around Melbourne, Australia, stopped work and marched from the University of Melbourne to Parliament House to achieve an eight-hour day. Their direct action protest was a success, and they are noted as the first organised workers in the world to achieve an eight-hour day with no loss of pay, which subsequently inspired the celebration of Labour Day and May Day. In Tasmania the public holiday is called Eight Hours Day and in the Northern Territory it is called May Day.

The Labour Day public holiday varies considerably between the various states and territories. It is the first Monday in October in the Australian Capital Territory, New South Wales and South Australia. In Western Australia, it is the first Monday in March. In both Victoria and Tasmania, it is the second Monday in March. In the Northern Territory, and in Queensland it is the first Monday in May. More than 80 countries celebrate Labor Day. Labor Day is a long weekend.

Easter
The days of Easter vary each year depending on the day determined by the Western Christian calendar. Until 1994 Easter Tuesday was a Bank Holiday in Victoria (it retains this status partially in Tasmania). The day after Good Friday and before Easter Sunday is traditionally known as Holy Saturday. However, the states where that day is a public holiday use different terminology – it is officially gazetted as "Easter Saturday" in the ACT, New South Wales, and the Northern Territory; as "the day after Good Friday" in Queensland and South Australia; and as "Saturday before Easter Sunday" in Victoria.

ANZAC Day

ANZAC Day is a day on which the country remembers those citizens who fell fighting or who served the country in wars. ANZAC Day is commemorated on 25 April every year. The tradition began to remember the Australian and New Zealand Army Corps (ANZAC) soldiers who landed at Gallipoli in Turkey during World War I.

ANZAC Day commemoration features marches by veterans and by solemn "Dawn Services", a tradition started in Albany, Western Australia on 25 April 1923 and now held at war memorials around the country, accompanied by thoughts of those lost at war to the ceremonial sounds of The Last Post on the bugle. The fourth stanza of Laurence Binyon's poem For the Fallen (known as the "Ode of Remembrance") is often recited.

King's Birthday
In all states and territories except Queensland and Western Australia, the King's Birthday is observed on the second Monday in June. Because Western Australia celebrates Western Australia Day (formerly Foundation Day) on the first Monday in June, the Governor of Western Australia proclaims the day on which the state will observe the King's Birthday, based on school terms and the Perth Royal Show. There is no firm rule to determine this date before it is proclaimed, though it is typically the last Monday of September or the first Monday of October: in 2011 the King's Birthday holiday in Western Australia was moved from Monday, 3 October 2011 to Friday, 28 October 2011 to coincide with the Commonwealth Heads of Government Meeting (CHOGM), which was held in Perth. In parts of the Pilbara, it is celebrated on a different date from the rest of Western Australia, and it may even be celebrated on different dates in different parts of the Pilbara. In Queensland, it is celebrated on the 1st Monday in October.

The day has been celebrated since 1788, when Governor Arthur Phillip declared a holiday to mark the birthday of King George III. Until 1936 it was held on the actual birthday of the Monarch, but after the death of King George V, it was decided to keep the date at mid-year.

On that day the "King's Birthday honours list" is released naming new members of the Order of Australia and other Australian honours. This occurs on the date observed in the Eastern States, not the date observed in Western Australia.

The King's Birthday weekend and Empire Day, 24 May, were long the traditional times for public fireworks displays in Australia. Although they still occur, the tradition has recently been overshadowed by larger New Year's Eve fireworks, as the sale of fireworks to the public was banned by the states in the 1980s, and in the ACT as of 24 August 2009. In the Northern Territory fireworks remain available to the public on 1 July for the celebration of Territory Day.

Christmas Day

Christmas is observed on 25 December each year to commemorate the birth of Jesus. In Australia, it was introduced with British settlement in 1788 as the cultural norms were transferred to the new colonies.

Boxing Day

Boxing Day is on the day after Christmas, i.e. 26 December each year, except in South Australia. In South Australia, the first otherwise working day after Christmas is a public holiday called Proclamation Day.

Boxing Day is noted for the start of the post-Christmas sale season. The day has also become a significant sporting day. Melbourne hosts the Boxing Day Test match; the Sydney to Hobart Yacht Race also starts on this day.

Other holidays
Sunday is nominally a public holiday in South Australia.
Proclamation Day is in December in South Australia only.
Canberra Day is held on the 2nd Monday in March in the ACT. Prior to 2008, this holiday was celebrated on the 3rd Monday of March.
Melbourne Cup Day is held on the first Tuesday of November—the day of the Melbourne Cup. It was originally observed only in the Melbourne metropolitan area. From 2007 to 2009 in ACT, Melbourne Cup day was also a holiday called "Family and Community Day". The holiday continued from 2010 to 2017 but no longer coincided with Melbourne Cup day. In Victoria, the Public Holidays Act 1993 (Vic) was amended from 24 September 2008 and made the Melbourne Cup Day holiday applicable in all parts of the state (unless another day is observed in substitute). It also made the holiday applicable to employees covered by federal awards.
Recreation Day is the first Monday of November, and celebrated in Northern Tasmania where Regatta Day is not a holiday.
 Regatta Day is the second Monday in February, and is celebrated in Southern Tasmania. Previously it was held on the second Tuesday in February.
Geelong Cup Day is held on the fourth Wednesday of October in the city of Geelong, Victoria
Queensland Day is celebrated on 6 June each year, but not with a public holiday.
Adelaide Cup Day is held on the second Monday in March in South Australia (held in May before 2006)
Western Australia Day in Western Australia on the first Monday in June.
Picnic Day in the Northern Territory in August, and also May Day
Tasmania has Easter Tuesday as a bank holiday (for bank and government employees only).
New South Wales has the first Monday in August as a bank holiday (for bank employees only).
Many cities and towns observe local public holidays for their local Agricultural Show.  For example:
Darwin Show Day in Darwin area in late July
Royal Queensland Show Day in Brisbane area in August
Gold Coast Show in Gold Coast area in October
Territory Day celebrated in the Northern Territory on July 1 while not a designated public holiday, it remains the only Australian public celebration where the public may purchase fireworks for home detonation
’’National Day of Mourning for Her Majesty Queen Elizabeth II’’ was a "one off" national public holiday declared by the Prime Minister for 22 September 2022 to allow people to pay their respects for the death of Queen Elizabeth II, the longest-reigning Australian monarch.

Public holidays by state

Queensland
The days are set in the Holidays Act 1983.  Most public holidays include a second public holiday on a week-day if they happen to fall on Saturday or Sunday. In which case, both days are public holidays.

New Year's Day: 1 January, and if 1 January is a Saturday or Sunday, the following Monday.
Australia Day: 26 January, and if 26 January is a Saturday or Sunday, the following Monday.
Good Friday: on the date it is publicly observed, always a Friday.
The day after Good Friday: Always a Saturday, one day after Good Friday.
Easter Monday: The next Monday after Good Friday.
ANZAC Day: 25 April, and if 25 April is a Sunday, 26 April.
Labour Day ("May Day"): 1st Monday in May.
Birthday of the Sovereign: 1st Monday in October.
Christmas Day: 25 December.
Boxing Day: 26 December.

If Christmas Day (25 December) is a Saturday or Sunday, then 27 December is also a public holiday.
If Boxing day (26 December) is a Saturday or Sunday, then 28 December is also a public holiday.

Because of the variable days of Easter, Anzac day could fall on an Easter holiday. When ANZAC falls on Saturday, there is no week day public holiday. In such situations it is generally expected that the minister will proclaim extra public holidays on week-days to ensure every year has the same number of public holidays on week-days.

The minister of the state may proclaim and adjustments or additions, such as the date of the Brisbane Ekka Show day holiday. This day has historically always been proclaimed for the second Wednesday in August, except if there are 5 Wednesday's in August, in which case the third Wednesday in August.

New South Wales
Public holidays generally follow the national pattern, but special cases are resolved by the State Government and advised by proclamation. Details of future holidays can be found on the NSW Industrial Relations website. Public holidays are regulated by the New South Wales Public Holidays Act 2010 No 115, which supersedes the Banks and Bank Holidays Act 1912 No 43.

The first Monday in August is a Bank Holiday, during which banks and financial institutions are closed.

Australian Capital Territory and Jervis Bay Territory
Most New South Wales public holidays are public holidays in the Australian Capital Territory, with the addition of Canberra Day.

South Australia
Public holidays in South Australia are set out in the Holidays Act 1910, while additional holidays may be proclaimed in all or part of the State by the Governor. The Act defines public holidays and bank holidays, which are the same except where a holiday falls on a Saturday, in which case the public holiday is held on the following Monday and both the Saturday and Monday are bank holidays.

Victoria

Public holidays in Victoria are regulated by the Victorian Public Holidays Act 1993.

Victorian employees fall under the Workchoices system either as coming within the Commonwealth constitutional power (called "constitutional corporation employees") or because of Victoria's referral of its legislative powers to the Commonwealth for particular workplace relations matters.

Employee entitlements to public holidays and additional pay depend on whether they are covered by a federal award or agreement.

Employees not covered by a federal award or agreement are entitled to public holidays under the Victorian Public Holidays Act 1993. Also, all permanent employees not covered by a federal award or agreement who would normally work on a public holiday (or a substitute public holiday) are entitled to the holiday without loss of pay. Their employers are not required to provide additional payment if they work on a public holiday, but this does not exclude the possibility of employees and employers negotiating for additional pay.

Employees who are covered by a federal award or agreement are entitled to public holidays as provided by the relevant federal award or agreement and the Public Holidays Act 1993. Many federal awards and agreements also provide for additional penalty rates for work performed on a public holiday.

Restricted shop trading laws apply to Good Friday, Christmas Day and before 1 pm on Anzac Day. On these days only exempted businesses are permitted to open for trading. All public holidays and substitute public holidays are bank holidays.

In August 2015, the day before the AFL Grand Final, as well as Easter Sunday, were gazetted as Public Holidays within Victoria.  This date of the holiday is as gazetted by the Victorian Government and cannot be accurately predicted. In 2019, the Victorian Parliament legislated the AFL Grand Final public holiday by amending the Public Holidays Act 1993 (Vic).

The Victorian public holidays are as follows:

* Melbourne Cup Day is observed in most of the state, but various cup days and show days in the state's west are locally substituted. See the list at Non-Metropolitan Public Holiday Dates (Victoria Online).

Melbourne Show Day used to be observed on the Thursday in the last full week of September as a half-day public holiday—later changing to full day—until 1994 (abolished by the state government). Easter Tuesday was observed as a Bank Holiday in Victoria until 1994 (also abolished by the state government).

Western Australia

 *If a Public Holiday falls on a Saturday or Sunday, the following Monday is also observed as a Public Holiday
 #The King's Birthday may be held on a different date in regional communities

Penalty rates

Penalty rates are the rates of pay which an employee is paid higher than their standard base rate for working at times or on days, such as public holidays, which are outside the normal working week. They were introduced in 1947 for workers working on the Sabbath, as most workers were Christian, while today, these rates of pay are set by the Fair Work Commission.

See also
 Australian labour law
 Australian Pay and Classification Scales

References

 
Australia
Holidays
Holidays